Abhay (Sanskrit: अभय, "Fearless") is an Infantry Combat Vehicle (ICV) being developed in India by the Defence Research and Development Organisation (DRDO). Abhay is being developed as a technology demonstrator for replacing Indian Army BMP-2s.

Development began in the 1990s and design was complete in 2001. , various systems of this vehicle were in advanced stages of development. By 2020, Indian military announced plans to begin operational use of the Abhay ICV in 2027.

Project
Abhay serves as a pre-technology demonstrator to develop and test technologies that will be used on a futuristic ICV (FICV), which will replace the Indian Army's BMP-2 vehicles. The project started in the late 1990s, and design work was completed by 2001. However, the project faced delays due to US sanctions imposed after the Pokhran-II Nuclear tests.

Abhay is being developed by the DRDO's Ahmednagar-based Vehicles Research & Development Establishment (VRDE). A Mild Steel (MS) prototype of the Abhay has been built, and is being tested for proving automotive systems. The pre-production prototype was rolled out in June 2005. Development of the first armoured prototype is also in progress.

In September 2019, it's announced that the FICV will be fast tracked.

In an interview emerged in January 2020, army chief Manoj Mukund Naravane told that induction of FICV is scheduled for 2026–27.

Design

Firepower
Abhay features an all-electrical turret drive system and a 40 mm high-velocity cannon capable of firing APFSDS and High explosive rounds. The 40MM APFSDS round has an effective penetration of 100 mm RHA at 1 km.

The anti-air firing range of the 40 mm cannon is 4 km and 2.5 km for ground attack. The ICV comes loaded with a total of 210 rounds of ammunition, and its turret, housing a thermal imager using the Catherine FC, also contains a twin-launcher for the Kornet-E ATGM (anti-tank guided missile). The Abhay is operated by a crew of three, and carries seven infantry soldiers.

FIRE CONTROL SYSTEM

An electro-mechanical all-electric drive (AED) for weapons control with independent stabilisation has been developed indigenously by DRDO in association with private sector industry for the turret. The purpose of the AED is to position the 40 mm cannon on to the target in azimuth and elevation and to provide twin-axis turret stabilisation against external disturbances.

The AED uses brush-less drives with especially designed backlash-free elevation and traverse gearboxes coupled to the turret ring for rotation in azimuth, and to sector gears for elevation/depression of the cannon, respectively. The AED also employs vector-control technologies implemented through digital controllers and insulated gate bipolar transistor (IGBT)-based power amplifiers for control of the brush-less drives. It also uses fibre-optic gyros as feedback elements for the purpose of stabilisation. AED has a provision for MIL-STD-1553B databus and RS-422 interfaces for real-time connectivity.

Mobility
Abhay is powered by a Greaves Cotton TD2 V8 410 kW (550 hp) diesel engine (a power-to-weight ratio of 24 hp/tonne) and an automatic gearbox supplied by L-3 Communications. The hydro-pneumatic suspension allows for increased passenger comfort. These factors will give Abhay excellent mobility and speed.

The DRDO's Defence Bioengineering and Electromedical Laboratory (DEBEL) based in Bengaluru is designing the ergonomical layout of Abhay.

Protection

Abhay is fitted with NBC protection system and Advanced Laser Warning system, which alerts the crew and turns the turret towards the direction of the laser beam.

Integrated Fire Suppression System 
(IFSS) has been developed to suppress fire in engine, ammunition and crew compartment.

Armour
Abhay is equipped with composite armour. Two prototypes were built. The first one was with the steel armour and the second one was fitted with the composite armour. The composite armour reduces the weight by 40% compared to steel. Lighter ERA has been developed to be used on the Abhay.

References

External links
 DRDO Techfocus on Abhay IFV
 Abhay IFV at GlobalSecurity.org

Infantry fighting vehicles of the post–Cold War period
Infantry fighting vehicles of India
Military vehicles of India
Post–Cold War military equipment of India
Tracked infantry fighting vehicles